Affo Omorou Erassa (born 19 February 1983) is a Togolese former professional footballer who played as a midfielder.

Club career
Erassa was born in Lomé. He previously played for Clermont Foot in Ligue 2 and AS Moulins in the Championnat National.

International career
Erassa was a member of the Togo national team and was called up to the 2006 World Cup.

References

External links
 
 
 

1983 births
Living people
Togolese footballers
Association football midfielders
Togo international footballers
2006 FIFA World Cup players
Ligue 2 players
Championnat National players
AC Merlan players
Clermont Foot players
AS Moulins players
RCO Agde players
21st-century Togolese people